A network distribution center (NDC) is a highly mechanized mail processing plant of the United States Postal Service that distributes standard mail and package services in piece and bulk form.

List of network distribution centers

The United States Postal Service currently has 22 NDCs:

 For mail originating in ZIP Code Areas 006-009 and addressed to addresses in those ZIP Code Areas, the sectional center facility in San Juan, Puerto Rico serves as the NDC.

List of international service centers

The United States Postal Service also has 5 international service centers (ISC) for distributing international mail:

See also
List of United States post offices
Sectional center facility (SCF)
United States Postal Service

References 

United States Postal Service